The 1874 Mid Surrey by-election was fought on 16 March 1874.  The byelection was fought due to the incumbent Conservative MP, Richard Baggallay, becoming Solicitor General for England and Wales.  It was retained by the incumbent.

References

1874 elections in the United Kingdom
1874 in England
19th century in Surrey
By-elections to the Parliament of the United Kingdom in Surrey constituencies
Unopposed ministerial by-elections to the Parliament of the United Kingdom in English constituencies
March 1874 events